The William D. Mullins Memorial Center, also known as the Mullins Center, is a 9,493-seat multi-purpose arena (10,500 for 360 concerts), located on the campus of the University of Massachusetts, in Amherst, Massachusetts. The Mullins Center is the home of UMass Minutemen men's basketball, women's basketball, and men's ice hockey. In addition, the venue hosts numerous concerts, family shows, theater shows, and commencements annually. Located adjacent to the Mullins Center is the Mullins Community Ice Rink, which is open for public skating and racquetball, while also serving as the home rink for the UMass women's ice hockey team.

In 1985, William D. Mullins, a state representative from Ludlow, suggested that the university needed a multipurpose arena and convocation center to help expand the athletic program and assist in the university's growth. He died in 1986, but the state went ahead with the building of the complex, naming it for him. It replaced the Curry Hicks Cage, the 1930s-era basketball gymnasium, as home of the Minutemen basketball teams. In addition, it allowed the hockey team, which had been downgraded to club status since the late 1970s, to be elevated to Division I status.

The Mullins Center is managed by Spectra, which manages over 70 different event arenas throughout the United States.

Concerts and events
The Mullins Center has hosted many performances over the years, including:

Musical

Family events

Entertainers, miscellaneous events

Sports

See also

 List of NCAA Division I basketball arenas

References

External links

 Mullins Center website
 University of Massachusetts Amherst Athletics
 Global Spectrum
 University of Massachusetts Amherst Amherst
 Comcast Spectacor

College basketball venues in the United States
College ice hockey venues in the United States
Basketball venues in Massachusetts
Indoor ice hockey venues in Massachusetts
UMass Minutemen and Minutewomen basketball
University of Massachusetts Amherst buildings
1993 establishments in Massachusetts
Sports venues completed in 1993